The Japan Railways Group, more commonly known as the  or simply JR, consists of seven  for-profit stock companies that took over most of the assets and operations of the government-owned Japanese National Railways (JNR) on April 1, 1987. Most of the liability of the JNR was assumed by the JNR Settlement Corporation.

The JR Group lies at the heart of Japan's railway network, operating a large proportion of intercity rail service (including the Shinkansen high-speed rail lines) and commuter rail service.

Because the railways used to be owned by the government, Japanese people generally make a distinction between JR railways (including former JR lines that are now third sector) and other private railways, and JR railways are almost always denoted differently from other private railways when shown on maps.

Companies

The Japan Railways Group consists of seven operating companies and two other companies that do not provide rail service. The operating companies are organized into six passenger operators and a nationwide freight operator. Unlike some other groups of companies, the JR Group is made up of independent companies, and it does not have group headquarters or a holding company to set the overall business policy.

The six passenger railways of the JR Group are separated by region. Nearly all their services are within the prescribed geographic area. However, some long-distance operations extend beyond the boundaries.

Japan Freight Railway Company operates all freight service on the network previously owned by JNR.

In addition, the group includes two non-operating companies. These are the Railway Technical Research Institute and Railway Information Systems Co., Ltd.

To cover various non-railway business areas, each regional operator in the JR Group has its own group of subsidiary companies with names like "JR East Group" and "JR Shikoku Group."

Network

JR maintains a nationwide railway network as well as common ticketing rules that it inherited from JNR. Passengers may travel across several JR companies without changing trains and without purchasing separate tickets. However, trains running across the boundaries of JR companies have been reduced.

JR maintains the same ticketing rules based on the JNR rules and has an integrated reservation system known as MARS (jointly developed with Hitachi). Some types of tickets (passes), such as Japan Rail Pass and Seishun 18 Ticket, are issued as "valid for all JR lines" and accepted by all passenger JR companies.

Ownership
In 1987, the government of Japan took steps to divide and privatize JNR. While division of operations began in April of that year, privatization was not immediate: initially, the government retained ownership of the companies. Privatization of some of the companies began in the early 1990s. By October 2016, all of the shares of JR East, JR Central, JR West and JR Kyushu had been offered to the market and they are now publicly traded. On the other hand, all of the shares of JR Hokkaido, JR Shikoku and JR Freight are still owned by Japan Railway Construction, Transport and Technology Agency, an independent administrative institution of the state.

All the JR Group companies operating in the Honshū region are constituents of the Nikkei 225 and TOPIX 100 indexes.

Background

The demise of the government-owned system came after charges of serious management inefficiencies, profit losses, and fraud. By the early 1980s, passenger and freight business had declined, and fare increases had failed to keep up with higher labor costs.

What remained of the debt-ridden Japanese National Railways after its 1987 breakup was named the Japanese National Railways Settlement Corporation. Its purpose was to dispose of assets and debts not absorbed by the successor companies and to execute other activities relating to the breakup, such as outplacement of former personnel.

The new companies introduced competition, cut their staffing, and made reform efforts. Initial public reaction to these moves was good: the combined passenger travel on the Japan Railways Group passenger companies in 1987 was 204.7 billion passenger-kilometers, up 3.2% from 1986, while the passenger sector previously had been stagnant since 1975. The growth in passenger transport of private railways in 1987 was 2.6%, which meant that the Japan Railways Group's rate of increase was above that of the private-sector railways for the first time since 1974. Demand for rail transport improved, although it still accounted for only 28% of passenger transportation and only 5% of cargo transportation in 1990. Rail passenger transportation was superior to automobiles in terms of energy efficiency and of speed in long distance transportation.

The six companies had  of routes (mostly  gauge) in use in the late 1980s. About 25% of the routes were in double-track and multitrack sections, and the rest were single-track. In 1988 about 51% of the six companies' 1,000 locomotives were diesel, and the rest were electric.

Japan Freight Railway Company owns its locomotives (295 diesel and 569 electric locomotives in 1988), rolling stock, stations and Intermodal container, but hires track from the six passenger companies. It runs fewer trains on less track than Japanese National Railways freight service did before its demise, but at increased revenues and higher productivity.

The  leased Shinkansen railway facilities, including  of  gauge high-speed track, to the passenger companies on Honshū. Some of the Shinkansen electric-powered trains operate at speeds up to 300 km/h.

There were twenty-seven private and third-sector companies in 1989.

Unions
Various unions represent workers at the different JR Group companies, such as the National Railway Workers' Union, All Japan Construction, Transport and General Workers' Union, Doro-Chiba, and the Japan Confederation of Railway Workers' Unions.

See also

 Rail transport in Japan
 List of railway companies in Japan
 Japan Railways locomotive numbering and classification
 SoftBank Telecom – former Japan Telecom, an affiliated company of JNR established in 1984

References

  - Japan

External links

 Hisakyu's Railway Guide
 JR's Rule on Passenger Tickets

1067 mm gauge railways in Japan
Standard gauge railways in Japan
Conglomerate companies of Japan
Japanese brands